HMS Lark was a modified Black Swan-class sloop of the Royal Navy. She was laid down by Scotts Shipbuilding and Engineering Company, Greenock on 5 May 1942, launched on 28 August 1943 and commissioned on 10 April 1944, with the pennant number U11.

Service in Royal Navy
Upon completion of her preparations in Tobermory, the Lark was deployed to defend convoys for Western Command.

Then in May and June 1944, he was part of the 114th Escort Group 114 with the sloop HMS Crane, HMS Chelmer and HMS Torrington to escort the assault convoys during the Allied landings in Normandy. during Operation Neptune.

Then he was assigned to protect arctic convoys (convoys JW 61 to JW 64 and RA 61 to RA 64) to supply the Russian front in Kola Bay.

On 17 February 1945, U-425 was sunk in the Barents Sea east of the Rybatchi Peninsula by depth charges from HMS Lark and HMS Alnwick Castle at the geographic position. The same day, at 10:15 a.m., the German submarine U-968 fired an acoustic torpedo at convoy RA 64 and observed a hit after 6 minutes 20 seconds. In fact, HMS Lark was hit aft northeast of Murmansk so she was towed into Kola Bay and grounded near Rosta.

HMS Lark was unequipped at Rosta because she was unable to return to the UK under tow. In June 1945, the carcass from which most of the equipment was removed was handed over to the Soviet Navy.

Service in Soviet Navy 
Postwar reports suggest that she may have later been taken into Russian Navy under the name Neptun, but this has not been proven. It is unlikely that the hull was rebuilt and retooled for further use.

References

Further reading 
 
 
 
 
 

 

Black Swan-class sloops
World War II sloops of the United Kingdom
Sloops of the United Kingdom
Ships built by Scotts Shipbuilding and Engineering Company
1943 ships